Fenghua is a district of the city of Ningbo, Zhejiang Province, China. The district and its administrative hinterlands has a population of over 480,000.

Fenghua is most famous for being the hometown of  former Presidents Chiang Kai-shek and Chiang Ching-kuo. Geographically, it is dominated by the Tiantai and Siming mountain ranges.

History 
Fenghua was established as a county in the Tang dynasty, in the territory of Mingzhou. Its name means "Accepting Reform" and adopted during imperial times. During the Song dynasty, immigration from the north increased exponentially, peaking during the loss of northern China to the Jurchen Jin dynasty during the Jin–Song wars. In 1129, Fenghua was raided by Jurchen cavalry in pursuit of Emperor Gaozong. Local militia at Xiaowangmiao fought off the invaders.

In late imperial times, Fenghua established itself as a meeting point for trade between the agrarian communities to the north, in Yinxian, and the mountain-based communities in the south. In exchange for grain and cereals, the hill peoples would trade bamboo, timber and other cash crops such as tea and tobacco. In the east of Fenghua, around Xiangshan, there existed also a number of fishing communities.

As with the rest of China, the 19th century brought about tumultuous changes. The Opium Wars with Britain devastated the economies of the coast. Around this time, many Fenghua men sought opportunity in the rising cities of Harbin, Weihaiwei and Shanghai. They later became famous in the 1920s for their dominance of the tailoring profession in downtown Shanghai, known as the "Feng Bang". But by far Fenghua's most famous son was Generalissimo Chiang Kai-shek, Chairman and later Director-General of the Kuomintang (KMT) (1926-1927, 1936–1975) and President of the Republic of China (1948-1975). Chiang's family were originally salt merchants in the township of Xikou (old pronunciation "Qikou"), a town in the west of Fenghua district.

Administrative divisions

Fenghua has 6 subdistricts and 6 towns.

Six subdistricts:
Jinping
Yuelin
Fangqiao (Fang-ch’iao-chen), established in January 2019

Six towns:
Xikou (Ch’i-k’ou-chen, /)
Chunhu (Shun-hu-chen; /)
Shangtian
Dayan
Qiucun
Song'ao/Song Ao (Sung-ao-shih)

Climate

Economy
Today, Fenghua is a centre for light manufacturing and small scale farming. It boasts a number of premier garment and textiles factories, including the Romon brand widely recognised in China. It is also home to the vast industrial facilities of Ningbo Bird, a leading Chinese mobile phone manufacturer. As the port city of Ningbo is further integrated into the burgeoning economic region of Shanghai, Fenghua will attract increased foreign investment and continue to grow.

In 2008, the district's gross domestic product was RMB 18.8 billion (per capita RMB 39,100), an increase of 8.1% from the previous year.

Tourism
Largely as a result of Chiang's fame, Fenghua attracts a large number of tourists. Aside from Chiang's former residence and related nostalgia, Fenghua has relatively few relics from the past. The great Xuedou Temple, once one of the ten great monasteries of Chan Buddhism, was destroyed during the Cultural Revolution. Other sites, along with numerous local shrines, clan halls and genealogies, also perished in those chaotic years.

To encourage the growing tourist trade, Fenghua municipality has made efforts to preserve remaining items of cultural interest. In 1988, for example, it rebuilt Xuedou Temple and also restored the Temple of King Xiao at Xiaowangmiao.

References

External links

Official website of Fenghua Government

Geography of Ningbo
Districts of Zhejiang